Thomas Peter Akers (October 4, 1828 – April 3, 1877) was a slave owner, attorney, college professor, and member of the United States House of Representatives from 1856 to 1857.  He was born in Knox County, Ohio, where he graduated from college and studied law.

He became a school teacher in Kentucky, and moved later, in 1853, to Lexington, Missouri.  He became a professor of mathematics and moral philosophy at Masonic College in Lexington, as well as the pastor of a local Methodist church there.

On August 18, 1856 he was elected to the United States House of Representatives as a Know Nothing to fill a vacant seat.  He spoke out against Republican anti-slavery speeches on the floor of Congress, calling them "driveling discussion" and "agitation,"  and spoke against Catholic immigration to the United States. He remained in his position through the next election.

He moved to New York City in 1861, and became a vice president of the gold board.  He subsequently moved to Utah Territory because of ill health, and eventually returned to Lexington, Missouri, where he died in 1877.

He is buried in Machpelah Cemetery in Lexington, Missouri.

References

Sources
Who's Who in America, Historical Volume, 1607-1896. Chicago:Marquis Who's Who, 1967.

1828 births
1877 deaths
People from Knox County, Ohio
Methodists from Missouri
Missouri Know Nothings
Know-Nothing members of the United States House of Representatives from Missouri
People from Lexington, Missouri
Lawyers from New York City
19th-century American politicians
Members of the United States House of Representatives from Missouri